Savage is the first extended play by South Korean girl group Aespa. The EP was released by SM Entertainment on October 5, 2021, and is available in three versions—P.O.S, Synk Dive and Hallucination Quest. It contains six songs, including the lead single of the same name.

Primarily a pop record with elements of dance pop, hyperpop and electropop, the EP was intended to demonstrate the group's musical diversity. Composition and production of Savage were handled by a wide array of songwriters and producers, including Yoo Young-jin, Kenzie, Brandon Green, Marcus Lomax, and Hayley Kiyoko, with SM Entertainment founder Lee Soo-man serving as executive producer. Lyrically, the album continues to expand Aespa's virtual universe.

The EP was commercial successful and positive received by music critics, who complimented its dark, futuristic "cyberpunk" style and incorporation of different music genres. Aespa's first entry on the US Billboard 200 at number 20, Savage also topped the Gaon Album Chart and was certified 2× Platinum by the Korea Music Content Association (KMCA) for selling 500,000 units. To promote the EP, Aespa appeared on South Korean music programs such as M Countdown, Music Bank, and Inkigayo.

Background and recording
On September 13, 2021, SM Entertainment announced that Aespa would be releasing their first extended play titled Savage on October 5, containing six tracks. The EP was released for pre-order on September 14. On September 27, the tracklist and lead single "Savage" were revealed. The tracklist included participation from an American singer-songwriter Hayley Kiyoko on the closing track "Lucid Dream". In an interview with the Grammy, Giselle revealed that they "actually didn't get to meet her and do an actual collaboration [even though] the song was made by her." The making of Savage marked the first time all the Aespa members recorded together in a studio, a process that turned out to be "a lot of fun for the members, who are all close friends." Ningning said that they had a great time recording the EP and got to try genres they haven't done before. According to the Paper magazine, Lee Soo-man, the founder of SM Entertainment and executive producer of their EP, "personally directed every small detail" of their production, including the pronunciation of every syllable.

Composition
Savage is primarily a pop record, specifically with elements of dance pop, hyperpop and electropop genres and a dark, futuristic "cyberpunk" style. It also incorporates an eclectic mix of house, deep house, R&B, dubstep, trap music, trance, and hip hop. Divyansha Dongre of Rolling Stone India described the EP as "multi-genre", and MTV noted that Savage "blends dance and pop with elements of house, trap, rap, and other genres." Rolling Stone stated that the record "showcases futuristic elements in its visuals and sound" and "further expands on the virtual world of Aespa."

Songs

The opening track, "Aenergy", is an "uplifting anthem" that explores "the group's members and the characteristics they showcase throughout their superheroine-like story, declaring each members' in-universe skills and abilities." Lead single "Savage" was described as "brilliant" in its eclectic blend of genres, including trap music, dubstep and intense power balladry with "drums and basses" as the main focus. Narrating the group's ongoing efforts to defy the Black Mamba, the track further elucidates Aespa and ae proceeding to the virtual world of Kwangya with the help of nævis. The song blends "addictive" hooks, rap verses and ad-libs while displaying the group's ability to take on varied vocals. NME positively compared the track to the work of Scottish musician Sophie Xeon. "I'll Make You Cry" is a dance-pop "fierce revenge anthem" with "a unique rhythm", "twinkling beats" and "ear-catching synth sound". "Haunting" belts escalate the song's "tenacious" atmosphere, along with "strong" vocal performances and "fierce" lyrics. The "eccentric", "high-energy" song "Yeppi Yeppi" is "bubbly" and features a combination of "deep house, trance, synthwave, and trap" genres, with lyrics containing the "positive message that if you think of yourself as beautiful rather than other people's opinions, then you will be happy". Winter named the song as her personal favorite. "Iconic" was described as a dance-pop song with "a force of revving production and fizzing hooks." It starts with "strong" hip hop and turns into "a series of alternatingly sweet and sassy verses all about how iconic Aespa is." The closing track, "Lucid Dream", is a dream pop alt R&B tune that emits a "hazy, ambient vibe" and features a "glitchy" electronic bridge. The song is a "poignant blur" of "hypnotic" synthesizers and "gentle" trap beats mixed with "intricate" layers of breathy vocals.

Promotion and release
On September 14, 2021, Savage was made available for pre-order in three versions: P.O.S, Synk Dive and Hallucination Quest. From September 23 to 25, the Hallucination Quest version of concept photos for the extended play was released. Synk Dive version and additional Hallucination Quest concept photos were released on September 26 and 29, respectively. The EP tracklist was revealed on September 27. The teaser for the music video of the lead single of the same name was released on October 4. The album was released on October 26, 2020, in physical and digital formats. The music video for lead single "Savage", directed by 725 (SL8 Visual Lab), was released on SM Entertainment's YouTube channel in conjunction with the release of the EP. On October 5, Aespa held a live event called "SYNK DIVE: aespa Savage SHOWCASE" on YouTube to introduce the EP and communicate with their fans. The group also performed on NBC's The Kelly Clarkson Show on October 16, their broadcast debut on US network television.

Critical reception

AllMusic critic David Crone stated that the EP is "a glitchy, futuristic take on the K-Pop mini-album" that continues to "demonstrate the star power of Aespa's leading foursome". Tamar Herman of the South China Morning Post summarized Savage as "cohesive listening experience" that is "invigorating and satisfying", adding it was "successful in showcasing what the members of Aespa have to offer as one of most ambitious newer female K-pop acts out there." She also included it on her list of best K-pop releases of October 2021. Carmen Chin of NME awarded the EP four stars out of five, writing that "Savage's brand of vibrant, punchy electronic pop falls perfectly in sync with the unconventionality aespa have so boldly presented in their one year as a group." MTV's Regina Kim stated that "Savage provides a sonic backdrop that exists outside this imagined world," and added that the mini album is "giving listeners glimpses into an overarching fable." In her review for PopMatters, Ana Clara Ribeiro described Savage as "a well-scripted, high-budget cyberpunk film" that "doesn't necessarily make you feel good, but it is good, and that’s why you watch it" because it "entertains and fascinates." She also named the track "I'll Make You Cry" a highlight on the EP.

Year-end lists

Commercial performance
On October 5, it was reported that pre-orders for Savage reached 401,088 copies. According to the South Korean Hanteo Chart, the EP was the "best-selling debut album for girl group's on the chart" after it sold more than 200,000 copies on the second day of its release. In South Korea, it debuted atop the Gaon Album Chart on the chart issue dated October 3–9, 2021. The EP also topped the daily and weekly editions of album charts such as Hanteo Chart, Synnara Record, Kyobo Bookstore, and Gaon Retail Album Chart. Within 15 days of release, it was reported that Savage sold 513,292 copies. In Japan, it peaked at number 18 on Billboard Japans Hot Albums chart and at number seven on the Oricon Albums Chart.

In the United States, Aespa made their debut on the Billboard 200 chart, with the EP entering at number 20 and becoming the highest-charting debut album by a K-pop girl group in Billboard history. Savage also placed first on Billboard's World Albums and Independent Albums charts and debuted at number two on the Top Album Sales chart with 17,500 units in pure sales.

Accolades

Track listing

Credits and personnel 
Credits adapted from the liner notes of the EP.

Musicians

 Aespa (Karina, Giselle, Winter, Ningning)vocals , background vocals 
 Yoo Young-jinKorean lyrics , composition , background vocals , arrangement 
 KenzieKorean lyrics , composition 
 Korean lyrics , background vocals 
 SaayKorean lyrics , background vocals 
 Jo Yoon-kyungKorean lyrics 
 Ellie Suh (153/Joombas)Korean lyrics 
 Kill Davecomposition , arrangement 
 Pat Morrisseycomposition , arrangement , keys & synths , piano & bongos , bass 
 Jess Corazzacomposition 
 Kirsten Collinscomposition , background vocals 
 Jia Lihcomposition , arrangement 
 Hautboi Richcomposition 
 Timothy 'Bos' Bullockcomposition , arrangement 
 Brandon Greencomposition , arrangement 
 Imlayarrangement , bass , sound fx 
 composition , arrangement , keyboard 
 Sophie Curtiscomposition 
 Val Del Prete (153/Joombas)composition 
 Timothy Tancomposition , arrangement , drum programming , sampling 
 Hayley Kiyokocomposition 
 Paul Phamouscomposition 
 Marcus Lomaxcomposition 
Kwon Ae-jinbackground vocals 
Ciara Muscatbackground vocals 
David Dahlquistkeys & synths , piano & bongos , bass 

Technical

 Yoo Young-jindirecting , recording , digital editing , mixing engineer , mixing 
 Kenziedirecting 
Deezdirecting 
Hwang Hyunvocal directing , digital editing 
Kim Yeon-seovocal directing 
Noh Min-jirecording , mixing engineer , digital editing 
Kang Sun-youngrecording , digital editing 
Kang Eun-jirecording , digital editing , mixing engineer 
Coach & Sendocomputer programming 
Lee Ji-hongdigital editing , mixing engineer 
Jang Woo-youngdigital editing 
Kim Chul-soonmixing 
Jeong Eui-seokmixing 
Nam Koong-jinmixing 
Jeon Hoonmastering
Kwon Nam-woomastering
Shin Soo-minmastering assistant

Charts

Weekly charts

Monthly charts

Year-end charts

Certifications and sales

Release history

See also
List of Gaon Album Chart number ones of 2021
List of K-pop albums on the Billboard charts
List of certified albums in South Korea

Notes

References

2021 debut EPs
Korean-language EPs
SM Entertainment EPs
Hyperpop albums